Willie Dunne (born 12 September 1933) is an Irish long-distance runner. He competed in the marathon at the 1960 Summer Olympics.

References

1933 births
Living people
Athletes (track and field) at the 1960 Summer Olympics
Irish male long-distance runners
Irish male marathon runners
Olympic athletes of Ireland
Sportspeople from Dublin (city)